The Open Air Field is an electronic music event in Luxembourg and takes place in Lintgen (near Mersch). The first edition of the event took place in July 2007 under the name Feldparty.

Every year the line-up contains a lot of DJ´s, such as DJ Pikay (DJ from the Nature One and the Ruhr in Love), DJ Jihay (also Nature One and Ruhr in Love) and DJ Theodor (Ruhr in Love). The number of visitors has been rising every year. In 2014 the concept has been changed and the event was renamed  Open Air Field

See also

List of electronic music festivals

External links 
 

Music festivals established in 2007
Electronic music festivals in Luxembourg